Radiant Solar Power Station is a  solar power plant, under construction in Kenya.

Location
This site lies adjacent to Eldosol Solar Power Station.

Overview
The power station has a capacity of 40 megawatts, to be sold directly to the Kenya Power and Lighting Company for integration in the national electricity grid. The electricity is evacuated via a substation near the power station, connected to a high voltage transmission line that passes near the power station. The power shares a common substation with the neighboring Eldosol Solar Power Station. The power will be sold at KSh12.36 (US$0.1236) per kilowatthour (kWh) under Kenya’s feed-in-tariff for solar power.

Developers
The power station is under development by a consortium comprising the entities listed in the table below. The developers also own the power station, as well as the adjacent 40 megawatt Eldosol Solar Power Plant.

Construction timeline, costs and funding
The cost of construction was budgeted at US€70 million (approx. KSh7.84 billion). In 2018, the European Investment Bank approved a loan of €30 million (KSh3.36 billion) towards the construction of this power station. The developer/owners will raise the difference of €40 million (approx. KSh4.48 billion). An equal loan amount was also approved for Eldosol Solar Power Station, by the same lender, on similar terms.

See also

List of power stations in Kenya

References

External links
 Spinning reserve power plants to be built in Eldoret and Suswa As of 15 January 2019.

Solar power stations in Kenya
Eldoret
Uasin Gishu County
Proposed solar power stations in Kenya